Anselmo Eyegue Nfono (born 5 September 1990), also known as Anselmo, is an Equatoguinean footballer who last played as a forward for Catalonian third division club Navata CF.

Club career
Anselmo played his first years for Briquets Deportivo, Escola Esportiva Guineueta and CF Damm. He signed for FC Barcelona B, FC Barcelona's second team aged 18 where he played 21 matches and scored 6 goals. He played for Spanish teams CD Alcoyano, Getafe FC and CA Pulpileño and then signed for Colombian team La Equidad, however he left the club shortly after to sign with Omani club Bowsher. In 2012, Anselmo returned to Spain, where signed for UDA Gramenet. Later he played for UE La Jonquera and CF Montañesa. He last played for Navata CF in the Catalonian third division.

International career
Anselmo made his Equatorial Guinea national team debut on 15 June 2008 in a World Cup 2010 Qualifying match against Nigeria in Malabo. That day the Nzalang Nacional (the nickname of Equatorial Guinea national football team) lost by 1–0. Later, he played against South Africa on 11 October 2008, in Malabo and a friendly match against Cape Verde on 28 March 2009 in Espargos. He scored against Morocco on 11 August 2010.

Career statistics

International

International appearances

International goals

|}

References

External links
 
 
 
 

1990 births
Living people
Sportspeople from Malabo
Equatoguinean footballers
Association football forwards
CD Alcoyano footballers
Getafe CF B players
UDA Gramenet footballers
Divisiones Regionales de Fútbol players
Equatorial Guinea international footballers
Equatoguinean expatriate footballers
Equatoguinean expatriate sportspeople in Oman
Expatriate footballers in Oman
CF Damm players
CF Montañesa players
UE Vilassar de Mar players
Equatoguinean emigrants to Spain
Footballers from Barcelona